is a Japanese anime series that originally aired in Japan during 2001 and 2002 on TBS. The series is about quintuplets who have many adventures together.

The series has been dubbed into English by The Ocean Group as Let's Go Quintuplets! and aired in New Zealand. The first two episodes of the English dub were released on a dual audio European Spanish DVD.

The series totals 50 episodes, each one consisting of 1 to 2 parts.

The name Go! Go! Itsutsugo has a double meaning. Go is, apart from the English word, also Japanese for "five". Itsutsugo means quintuplet.

Characters
The names of the characters were changed in the English dub but the initials of each name were preserved.

  is the oldest of the five twins, although only by a few minutes.
  is the most self-centered. She already knows she is going to become a movie star and therefore gives signed autographs away.
  is the bookworm and wants to win the Nobel Prize.
  wants to become a true superhero - a detective or something else.
  is the youngest of the quintuplets. She wants to save the world and all animals (except frogs)
  is an affectionate little dog owned by the Miller (Morino) family.

Cast

Japanese
 Chie Koujiro - Arashi Morino
 Fujiko Takimoto - Kabuto Morino
 Hiro Yuuki - Hinoki Morino
 Kae Araki - Kodama Morino
 Yuko Mizutani - Kinoko Morino

English
 Sharon Alexander - Karly Miller
 Don Brown - Principal
 Noel Callahan - Karl Miller
 Gabe Khouth 
 Danny McKinnon - Austin Miller
 Scott McNeil - Jack Miller
 Colin Murdock - Officer Collins
 Nicole Oliver - Ms. Carruthers
 Tabitha St. Germain - Krystal Miller
 Chantal Strand - Vanessa, Bridget
 Venus Terzo
 Cathy Weseluck - Harold Miller
 Jillian Michaels - Matthew, Mermaid (episodes 9, 48)
 Michael Coleman - Leroy Green (episode 24)

Episode list
Note: of most of the episodes the English dub name isn't known.

International

References

External links 
 
 Let's Go Quintuplets! at the official TBS website

2001 anime television series debuts
Anime with original screenplays
Eiken (studio)
Fantasy anime and manga
TBS Television (Japan) original programming
Magic Bus (studio)